Kapala is a village and commune in the Cercle of Koutiala in the Sikasso Region of southern Mali. The commune covers an area of 199 square kilometers and includes 4 villages. In the 2009 census the commune had a population of 4,064. The village of Kapala, the administrative centre (chef-lieu) of the commune, is about 20 km south of Koutiala.

References

External links
.

Communes of Sikasso Region